Lieutenant-Commander John Cracroft-Amcotts, DSC, DL, JP (3 January 1891 – 30 May 1956) was an English landowner, soldier and local politician, who served as Vice-Chairman of Kesteven County Council and High Sheriff of Lincolnshire.

Early life and family 
John Cracroft-Amcotts was born on 3 January 1891, the second of two sons of Major Frederick Augustus Cracroft-Amcotts, JP (1853–1897), of Kettlethorpe Hall in Lincolnshire, and his wife, Emily Grace (died 1936), JP, youngest daughter of Anthony Willson, of South Rauceby Hall, Lincolnshire; his elder brother was Sir Weston Cracroft-Amcotts, and his father was the son of Weston Cracroft Amcotts, a Member of Parliament for Mid-Lincolnshire.

Cracroft-Amcotts married, on 12 February 1930, May, widow of Frederic Martin Campbell and daughter of H. Redfearn-Shaw, an officer in the Malayan Civil Service; they had three daughters: Barbara Anne (born 1932, married Peter Hugh Davies), Erica Sylvia (born and died 1934) and Gillian Verity (1936-2019).

Career 

Following schooling at Aysgarth and Stubbington, Cracroft-Amcotts trained on HMS Britannia. He enrolled as a Midshipman in the Royal Navy on 15 May 1907, and was promoted to Sub-Lieutenant on 15 September 1910, and Lieutenant on 15 September 1913. Cracroft-Amcotts served in Europe during World War I and, on 1 October 1917, received the Distinguished Service Cross; he was also mentioned in dispatches twice. He was promoted to be emergency Lieutenant-Commander on 15 September 1921.

After being placed on the retired list of the Royal Navy, Cracroft-Amcotts went to Malaya, where he planted rubber. In 1931 he received Rauceby Hall and the connected estate by deed and gift. Three years later, he became a County Councillor for Kesteven and was elected an Alderman in 1950. In 1955, he became vice-chairman of the Council and served till his death. Cracroft-Amcotts also served as a Justice of the Peace (from 1933), High Sheriff of Lincolnshire (in 1937) and a Deputy Lieutenant of the county (from 1951), as well as chairman and then president of the Grantham and Sleaford Divisional Conservative Association.

A keen angler, shooter, carpenter and painter, Cracroft-Amcotts carved and painted the shield of Kesteven County Council and presented it to hang in the authority's chamber. He died on 30 May 1956.

References 

1891 births
1956 deaths
Royal Navy officers
High Sheriffs of Lincolnshire
Members of Kesteven County Council
People educated at Aysgarth School
People educated at Stubbington House School